Wunsch is a German surname. Notable people with the surname include:

Carl Wunsch (born 1941), American oceanographer
Donald Frederick Sandys Wunsch (1887–1973), New Zealand chemical engineer and factory manager
Donald Wunsch, son of D.F.S. Wunsch and computer engineer
Harry Wunsch (1910–1954), guard in the National Football League
Ilse Gerda Wunsch (1911-2003), German-American composer
Jerry Wunsch (born 1974), former American college and professional football player
Johann Jakob von Wunsch (1717–1788), soldier of fortune and Prussian general of infantry, and a particularly adept commander of light infantry
Kelly Wunsch (born 1972), former professional baseball pitcher
Noah Wunsch (born 1970), German painter, photographer and designer

See also
Wunsch Building, in Brooklyn, New York
Needleman–Wunsch algorithm, algorithm used in bioinformatics to align protein or nucleotide sequences

References

German-language surnames
German toponymic surnames